QH-II-66 (QH-ii-066) is a sedative drug which is a benzodiazepine derivative. It produces some of the same effects as other benzodiazepines, but is much more selective than most other drugs of this class and so produces somewhat less sedation and ataxia than other related drugs such as diazepam and triazolam, although it still retains anticonvulsant effects.

QH-ii-066 is a highly subtype-selective GABAA agonist which was designed to bind selectively to the α5 subtype of GABAA receptors.

The α5 subtype (and to a lesser extent the α1 subtype) of GABAA are two of the most important targets in the brain that produce the effects of alcohol, and so one of the purposes for which QH-ii-066 was developed was to reproduce the GABAergic effects of alcohol separately from its other actions.

QH-ii-066 replicates some of the effects of alcohol, such as sedation and ataxia, but does not increase appetite, as this effect seems to be produced by the α1 subtype of GABAA rather than α5. The inverse agonist Ro15-4513, which blocks the α5 subtype of GABAA, reverses the effects of alcohol, suggesting that this subtype is also important in producing the subjective effects of alcohol intoxication.

See also 
 GL-II-73
 SH-I-048A
 SH-053-R-CH3-2′F

References 

Benzodiazepines
Sedatives
Hypnotics
Ethynyl compounds
Lactams
GABAA receptor positive allosteric modulators